MF Dubrovnik is a ferry sailing on international and coastal routes, operated by Croatian company Jadrolinija. Currently maintaining routes between Croatia and Italy. Built in 1979 in Ireland for B&I Line. Former names: Connacht (1979-1988), Duchesse Anne (1989-1996, with Brittany Ferries company) and Dubrovnik (1996). Capacity 1300 people and 300 vehicles.  149 cabins with a total of 459 beds and 384 airline seats. A restaurant with 135 seats, self-service restaurant with 224 seats, a patisserie, a bar-cafe (274 seats), video room, a movie theatre with 96 seats, children's room, shopping room.

External links

Ferries of Croatia
Ships built in Ireland
1978 ships